Geysir Green Energy is an Icelandic energy company. It is part-owned by Atorka, Íslandsbanki, VGK-Invest and Reykjanesbæjar and specializes in projects related to geothermal energy production and maximising potential in low-temperature areas. Geysir Green Energy was established on January 5, 2007, and on April 30, 2007 the company purchased a 15.2% stake in Hitaveita Suðurnesja for 7.6 billion króna. Among the major projects of the company is ENEX, a subsidiary which develops power plants that use geothermal energy. Enex-China is a joint project between Enex and the Chinese Shaanxi Geothermal Energy Development Corporation. The company also owns stake in Ram Power Inc., which is involved in the development of geothermal energy in the United States.

References

Energy companies of Iceland
Geothermal energy in Iceland
Energy companies established in 2007
Renewable resource companies established in 2007
2007 establishments in Iceland